Peristernia australiensis is a species of sea snail, a marine gastropod mollusk in the family Fasciolariidae, the spindle snails, the tulip snails and their allies.

Distribution

Description

Ecology
Parasites of Peristernia australiensis include trematode Lobatostoma manteri.

References

External links

Fasciolariidae
Gastropods described in 1847